Malcolm Moore (born 18 December 1948 in Silksworth, England) is an English footballer who played as a centre forward for Sunderland, Crewe Alexandra, Tranmere Rovers, Hartlepool United and Workington.

References

Sunderland A.F.C. players
Tranmere Rovers F.C. players
Crewe Alexandra F.C. players
Hartlepool United F.C. players
Workington A.F.C. players
1948 births
Living people
People from the City of Sunderland
Footballers from Tyne and Wear
Association football forwards
English Football League players
Gateshead F.C. players
English footballers